is a Japanese footballer who plays for Yokohama F. Marinos and the Japan national team.

International
He made his debut for the Japan national football team on 26 March 2019 in a friendly against Bolivia, as a starter.

Club statistics
Updated to 19 December 2020.

National team statistics

Honours

Club
Yokohama F. Marinos
 J1 League (2): 2019, 2022

References

External links
Profile at Tokyo Verdy
Profile at FC Machida Zelvia

1995 births
Living people
Association football people from Kanagawa Prefecture
Japanese footballers
J1 League players
J2 League players
J3 League players
Tokyo Verdy players
FC Machida Zelvia players
Yokohama F. Marinos players
J.League U-22 Selection players
Association football defenders
Japan international footballers